The cardiocentric hypothesis was the historical belief that the heart controls sensation, thought, and body movement. Cardiocentrism was first derived from the ancient Egyptian belief that the heart was the house of thought and soul. This idea was later accepted by Greek philosophers such as Aristotle, Diocles, and Praxagoras of Cos. With the development of modern science and anatomy, the cardiocentric hypothesis was eventually proven incorrect, though its emphasis in Antiquity may have helped contribute to the discovery of the cardiovascular system and influenced the anatomical views of Europe and the Islamic World in the [Middle Ages].

An opposing theory called "cephalocentrism", which proposed that the brain played the dominant role in controlling the body, was first introduced by Pythagoras in 550 BC, who argued that the soul resides in the brain and is immortal. His statements were supported by Plato, Hippocrates, and Galen of Pergamon. Plato believed that the body is a "prison" of the mind and soul and that in death the mind and soul become separated from the body, meaning that neither one of them could die.

History 

In ancient Egypt, people believed that the heart is the seat of the soul and the origin of the channels to all other parts of the body, including arteries, veins, nerves, and tendons. The heart was also depicted as determining the fate of ancient Egyptians after they died. It was believed that Anubis, the god of mummification, would weigh the deceased person's heart against a feather. If the heart was too heavy, it would be considered guilty and consumed by the Ammit, a mythological creature. If it was lighter than the feather, the spirit of the deceased would be allowed to go to heaven. Therefore, the heart was kept in the mummy while other organs were generally removed.

However, the ancient Greeks, Aristotle promoted the cardiocentric hypothesis based on his experience with animal dissection. He found that certain primitive animals could move and feel without the brain, and so deduced that the brain was not responsible for movement or feeling. Apart from that, he pointed out that the brain was at the top of the body, far from the centre of the body, and felt cold.  He also performed anatomical examinations after strangling the specimen, which would cause vasoconstriction of the arterioles in the lungs. This likely had the effect of forcing blood to engorge the veins and make them more visible in the following dissection. Aristotle observed that the heart was the origin of the veins in the body, and concluded that the heart was the centre of the psycho-physiological system. He also stated that the existence of pneuma in the heart was to function as a messenger, traveling through blood vessels to produce sensation. Movement of body parts was thought to be controlled by the heart as well. From Aristotle's perspective, the heart was composed of sinews which allowed the body to move.

In the fourth century BC, Diocles of Carystus reasserted that the heart was the physiological centre of sensation and thought. He also recognised that the heart had two cardiac ears. Although Diocles also proposed that the left brain was responsible for intelligence and the right one was for sensation, he believed that the heart was dominant over the brain for listening and understanding. Praxagoras of Cos was a follower of Aristotle's cardiocentric theory and was the first one to distinguish arteries and veins. He conjectured that arteries carry pneuma while transporting blood. He also proved that a pulse can be detected from the arteries and explained that the arteries' ends narrowed into nerves.

The Islamic philosopher and physician Avicenna followed Galen of Pergamon, believing that one's spirit was confined in three chambers of the brain and accepted that nerves originate from the brain and spinal cord, which control body movement and sensation. However, he maintained the earlier cardiocentric hypothesis. He stated that activation for voluntary movement began in the heart and was then transported to the brain. Similarly, messages were delivered from a peripheral environment to the brain and then via the vagus nerve to the heart.

In the Middle Ages, the German Catholic friar Albertus Magnus made contributions to physiology and biology. His treatise was based on Galen's cephalocentric theory and was profoundly affected by Avicenna's preeminent Canon, which itself had been influenced by Aristotle. He combined these ideas in a new way which suggested that nerves branched off from the brain but that the origin was the heart. He concluded that philosophically, all matters originated from the heart, and in the corporeal explanation, all nerves started from the brain.

William Harvey, an early modern English physiologist, also agreed with Aristotle's cardiocentric view. He was the first to describe the basic operation of the circulatory system, by which blood was pumped by the heart to the rest of the body, in detail. He explained that the heart was the centre of the body and the source of life in his treatise De Motu Cordis et Sanguinis in Animalibus.

The cephalocentric perspective 

Hippocrates of Kos was the first to suggest that the brain was the seat of the soul and intelligence. From his treatise De morbo sacro, he pointed out that the brain controls the rest of the body and is responsible for sensation and understanding. Apart from that, he believed that all feelings originated from the brain.

Plato was also a supporter of cephalocentricism. From his perspective, the soul was the essence of humanity, and he devised the tripartite theory of the soul which states that there are three soul species in the body. The one regarded as “immortal” and “divine” was in the brain and controlled voluntary movement. The other two were located in the chest and near the liver, which were responsible for feeling and desire.

Galen of Pergamon was a biologist and physician. His approach to the investigation of the brain was due to his rigorous anatomical methodology. He pointed out that only correct dissection will support the incontrovertible statement. He reached the conclusion that the brain was responsible for sensation and thought, and that nerves originated at the spinal cord and brain.

References

Further reading

History of medicine
History of anatomy
Cardiac anatomy
Heart
Natural philosophy